UFC 286: Edwards vs. Usman 3 was a mixed martial arts event produced by the Ultimate Fighting Championship that took place on March 18, 2023, at The O2 Arena in London, England.

Background 
A UFC Welterweight Championship trilogy bout between current champion Leon Edwards and former champion (also The Ultimate Fighter: American Top Team vs. Blackzilians welterweight winner) Kamaru Usman headlined the event. The pairing first met at UFC on Fox: dos Anjos vs. Cowboy 2 in December 2015, where Usman won by unanimous decision. Their second meeting took place at UFC 278 in August 2022, where Edwards won the title by knockout in the fifth round. Former interim champion Colby Covington served as back up and potential replacement for this fight.

A lightweight bout between Michał Figlak and Chris Duncan was scheduled for the event. However, Figlak was forced to withdraw from the event citing injury and was replaced by Omar Morales.

A featherweight bout between Nathaniel Wood and Lerone Murphy was scheduled for the event. However, Wood was forced to withdraw from the event due to a leg injury. He was replaced by the LFA Featherweight Champion Gabriel Santos.

A welterweight bout between Gunnar Nelson and Daniel Rodriguez was scheduled for this event. However, Rodriguez withdrew due to undisclosed reasons and was replaced by Bryan Barberena.

At the weigh-ins, Malcolm Gordon weighed in at 129.5 pounds, three and a half pounds over the flyweight non-title fight limit. His bout proceeded at catchweight and he was fined 30% of his purse which went to his opponent Jake Hadley.

During the event's broadcast, former UFC Middleweight Champion Anderson Silva was announced as the next "pioneer wing" (as his career started prior to the implementation of the Unified Rules of MMA) UFC Hall of Fame inductee. Silva still holds the record for longest championship reign (2,457 days) in UFC history and the longest win streak (16) in the organization's history.

Results

Bonus awards 
The following fighters received $50,000 bonuses.
Fight of the Night: Justin Gaethje vs. Rafael Fiziev
Performance of the Night: Gunnar Nelson and Jake Hadley

See also 

 List of UFC events
 List of current UFC fighters
 2023 in UFC

References 

Ultimate Fighting Championship events
2023 in mixed martial arts
2023 sports events in London
2023 in English sport
Mixed martial arts in the United Kingdom
Sport in London
March 2023 sports events in the United Kingdom